Markle Foundation is a New York-based private foundation established in 1927 by American industrialist / financier John Markle and his wife, Mary. Its focus is technology, health care, and national security.

History
Formally incorporated on April 26, 1927, as the John and Mary R. Markle Foundation, the organization began by funding traditional social welfare programs as well as projects that focused on medicine and medical research. In 1969, Lloyd Morrisett, the Markle Foundation's president at that time, shifted the foundation's focus to mass communications in a democratic society. In 1998, when Zoë Baird became president, she shifted the foundation's focus to accelerating the use of information and information technology to address critical public problems, particularly in the areas of health and national security.  For fiscal year 2008, Ms Baird's compensation from this tax exempt charitable organization was recorded as $505,750.00, in the Form 990-PF filed by Markle.

In 1948, the Foundation established an award to assist qualified people wishing to remain in academic medicine.

Personnel
Zoë Baird - CEO and President 
Beth F. Cobert - Chief Operating Officer, Markle Foundation  and CEO, Skillful (A Markle Initiative) 
Carol Diamond - Managing Director Health 
 Juliana Herman - Chief of Staff and Senior Advisor 
 Denis McDonough - Senior Advisor 
 Susan Roberson - Chief Financial Officer and Treasurer

References

External links
 
 Markle Foundation Archives
 Policy Archive Markle Collection

Foundations based in the United States
Organizations established in 1927
1927 establishments in the United States
501(c)(3) organizations
Organizations based in New York City